Greta Onieogou (born 14 March 1991) is a Canadian actress, best known for her lead role as Layla Keating in the American drama series All American and as Soraya Duval in the Canadian drama Heartland.

Early life
Onieogou was born in Leningrad, Russian SFSR, Soviet Union in southern Saint Petersburg, Russia to Nigerian-Russian parents. When Onieogou was five, she moved with her parents to Toronto. She used to be a rhythmic gymnast and worked with Alexandra Orlando for a couple months during her training.

Career
In 2018, Onieogou was cast in the pilot for All American.

In 2019, Onieogou started her own YouTube channel.

Personal life
Onieogou is fluent in Russian and English.

Filmography

References

External links 
 
 

1991 births
Living people
Actresses from Saint Petersburg
Actresses from Toronto
Soviet emigrants to Canada
Russian emigrants to Canada
Canadian people of Nigerian descent
Canadian people of Russian descent
Canadian film actresses
Canadian television actresses